The New Orleans Squadron or the New Orleans Station was a United States Navy squadron raised out of the growing threat the United Kingdom posed to Louisiana during the War of 1812. The first squadron consisted of  vessels and was mostly defeated during the war. Afterward, new ships were stationed at New Orleans which engaged in counter-piracy operations for over twenty years. The New Orleans Squadron was eventually merged with the Home Squadron.

History

War of 1812

Originally commanded by Daniel Patterson in 1814, the squadron consisted of fifteen vessels, including the schooners USS Carolina and USS Sea Horse, the two small sloops-of-war USS Alligator and USS Tickler along with several Jeffersonian class gunboats. On December 13, 1814, the Sea Horse fought with seven British longboats from a British flotilla of 42 armed longboats which was heading to Lake Borgne. The next day, the longboat flotilla defeated the squadron's five gunboats under Thomas ap Catesby Jones at the Battle of Lake Borgne, and USS Alligator and USS Tickler were also captured and scuttled. As result of this action, the British gained control of the lake which was then used as the landing zone for their army that marched on New Orleans.  On December 27, as part of the Battle of New Orleans, the Carolina was badly damaged by enemy artillery fire and abandoned by her crew. She later exploded when fire reached her powder magazine. 

Although Jean Lafitte would later fight for America at New Orleans in January 1815, the squadron had operated against his pirates until ultimately being evicted from their base at Barataria on September 16, 1814 by Commodore Patterson. Six of his pirate ships were captured without a fight and around $500,000 worth of valuables were taken as prize.

Anti-Piracy Operations

Between the War of 1812 and 1830, piracy in the West Indies flared up again, prompting the United States to take more serious action against the outlaws.

By 1818, Jean Lafitte commanded a fleet of ships pirating out of Galveston, Texas; so the New Orleans Squadron began operations against him. About this time Lafitte suffered a significant distraction from his activities; a hurricane hit Galveston in September 1818, leaving his base in ruins, and one of his newest ships was captured by the squadron. In 1821, the USS Enterprise, under Lieutenant Lawrence Kearny, arrived at Galveston and demanded Lafitte's departure, which was accomplished without bloodshed. (The revenue cutters USRC Alabama and USRC Louisiana captured another one of Lafitte's ships in 1819. Both cutters were temporarily serving with the New Orleans station at the time.)

On the other side of the Gulf of Mexico, and in the Caribbean, attacks on American merchant ships by Spanish and Central American pirates increased. Over the course of the next decade, thousands of attacks on merchant vessels by West Indies pirates were reported; many of the victims were American ships. In 1821, the first U.S. Navy fleet created specifically to fight piracy in the Caribbean became known as the West Indies Squadron. When this squadron was deployed, piracy in the New Orleans region began to decline for good.

By 1838, the Home Squadron was created and was used for protecting the American coastline until the outbreak of Civil War in 1861.

References
Citations

Bibliography

 
 Wombwell, James A., The Long War Against Piracy: Historical Trends(2009) pg.# 40-41
 
 

Ship squadrons of the United States Navy